Marie-Claude Bibeau   (born April 4, 1970) is a Canadian politician who was elected to represent the riding of Compton—Stanstead in the House of Commons in the 2015 federal election. A member of the Liberal Party of Canada, she was sworn in as Minister of International Development and La Francophonie on November 4, 2015. She was appointed the first female Minister of Agriculture on March 1, 2019.

Career
Bibeau was born and raised in Sherbrooke, Quebec and earned a bachelor's degree in economics and a graduate diploma in environmental management from Université de Sherbrooke. Following her graduation, she worked for the Canadian International Development Agency, and was variously posted in Ottawa, Montreal, Morocco and Benin. After leaving the agency, she returned to Compton, and spent 15 years operating a successful tourism business.

In her capacity as minister, Bibeau helped shape Trudeau's foreign policy. She served a two-year term as member of the World Bank Group’s (WBG) Advisory Council on Gender and Development from 2015 until 2017. In September 2016, Bibeau was appointed by United Nations Secretary-General Ban Ki-moon to serve as member of the Lead Group of the Scaling Up Nutrition Movement. Also since 2016, she has been serving on the board of the Global Partnership to End Violence Against Children. In 2017, she served on the World Health Organization/Office of the United Nations High Commissioner for Human Rights High-Level Working Group on the Health and Human Rights of Women, Children and Adolescents, chaired by Tarja Halonen and Hina Jilani.

Personal life
She is married to Bernard Sévigny, former mayor of Sherbrooke.

Electoral record

References

External links
 Official Website
Bio & mandate from the Prime Minister

Living people
1970 births
Liberal Party of Canada MPs
Members of the House of Commons of Canada from Quebec
Women members of the House of Commons of Canada
Université de Sherbrooke alumni
Members of the King's Privy Council for Canada
Members of the 29th Canadian Ministry
Politicians from Sherbrooke
Women government ministers of Canada
21st-century Canadian women politicians